Creature 3D is a 2014 Indian 3D monster-horror film directed by Vikram Bhatt. It is produced by Bhushan Kumar and Krishan Kumar and co-produced by Ajay Kapoor under the banner of T-Series in association with BVG Films. It stars Bipasha Basu and Imran Abbas in lead roles. The film marks the Bollywood debut of Pakistani actor Imran Abbas. The film also stars Mukul Dev and Deepraj Rana in supporting roles.

The film released threatically on 12 September 2014 with received negative reviews from critics upon its release and turned out to be a box office failure.

Plot
Ahana opens a hotel in Glendale, Himachal Pradesh. She requires manpower, furniture and various other items for her hotel. She talks to a driver to transport the items quickly. However, the driver is stuck in the middle of the forest and his truck is damaged. During the conversation the driver hears strange noises coming from the surrounding area. Upon investigating he sees a monster and runs back to the truck, locking himself in the back. The monster first lands on the roof of the truck and tears it open. It then attacks the driver and kills him.

On the day of the opening party, Ahana meets Kunal Anand, a novelist, and are attracted to each other. One day, a chef of Ahana's hotel is killed by that beast. A newly married couple staying in Ahana's hotel go for a picnic in the forest and the man is killed by the monster while his wife gets severely injured and later recovered by authorities. Similar incidents then follow in which other people die. The chief suspect of the incidents is believed to be an animal, leading to the capture of a leopard. Ahana is relieved as a result, though it turns out that it was not the creature and she doesn't know that the creature was responsible for it. One particular night the beast enters Ahana's hotel. Upon seeing the behemoth, the people inside the hotel panic and run away but the beast manages to kill and injured several people. Just when it was about to kill Ahana, Kunal manage to save her but the beast manages to get hold of them. Just when it was about to make its final move, a scientist enters the scene and scares away the monster with fire. The people realize that it is scared of fire and is, in fact,  a Brahmarakshasa. Due to the havoc caused by it, Ahana’s hotel loses its reputation and almost goes out of business.

There are few customers in Ahana's hotel and she is on the verge of getting bankrupt, which will result in the bank seizing the hotel.  They meet a scientist, the same one from before, who reveals that it is a Brahmarakshasa, a man-eating demonic entity conceived through the corruption of Brahmins upon death. He informs them that such demons still lurk in dense forests of India, but their sightings are as presumed to be sightings of UFOs. He suggests Ahana and Kunal to leave if they wish to stay alive. Ahana refuses to leave the hotel, determined to fight back.

Ahana, Kunal and the professor are joined in the fight by two cops, Inspector Rana and Inspector Chaubey, but the creature soon kills Chaubey. They learn that a Sarpanch filed a report of a monster sighting a few years back and go to meet him. He tells them that decades ago, a hunter killed a creature just like the one they encountered. He also informs them that the only person who can help them now is Dr. Moga, the son of the late hunter. Kunal and Ahana set for Shimla to meet him. On the way, Kunal reveals his true identity as Karan Malhotra, the chairman of the builder group that compelled Ahana's father to commit suicide. He tells her that he felt guilty and wanted to apologize. Heartbroken, Ahana breaks up with Karan.

Dr. Moga explains that the creature can be killed by a weapon dipped in the temple pond of the Brahma Temple in Pushkar but is effective only if dipped into the pond on night of Kartik Purnima. Since Kartik Purnima is many days away, Dr. Moga gives Ahana an old rifle with which his father had killed one of the creature. Dr. Moga tells Ahana that his father and his friends dipped 30 bullets in the pond on the night of Kartik Purnima, but they used up 23 bullets and still all the friends of his father died and only his father was left. He then hands over the left seven bullets to Ahana. Ahana, the professor, and Rana enter the den of the behemoth; Rana and the professor are killed by the beast, and when it tries to attack Ahana, Karan saves her. With Karan's help, Ahana manages to kill the creature with the last bullet in the rifle.

A few days later, the hotel is ready to be reopened. Ahana forgives Karan, and they rekindle their relationship.

Cast
 Bipasha Basu as Ahana Dutt
 Imran Abbas as Kunal Anand/Karan Malhotra
 Mukul Dev as Professor Sadana
 Deepraj Rana as Inspector Rana
 Mohan Kapoor as Doctor Moga
 Shirish Sharma as father of Ahana
 Amit Tandon as Arjun (Honeymoon couple Husband)
 Aparna Bajpai as Shruti (Honeymoon couple wife)
 Natasha Rana as Psychiatrist
 Milind Phatak as Gun Specialist / Hunter, and a friend of Karan
 Bikramjeet Kanwarpal as Inspector Chaubey
 Vikram Bhatt as voice of Creature.
 Rajshri Rani Pandey as Guest Appearance
 Alexander (Sasha) Dolbenko as a foreign hotel visiter

Music

The soundtrack and the lyrics of the film were written by Mithoon, except for "Sawan Aaya Hai" which has music and lyrics by Tony Kakkar. and sung by Arijit Singh. The film's soundtrack officially released on 31 July 2014. Koimoi stated that the soundtrack had received a good reception.

Reception
The trailer of the movie was released in July 2014. Koimoi negatively reviewed it as being "a half baked trailer that relies solely on 3D".

Vinayak Chakravorty of India Today gave 2 stars out of 5 to the movie stating that it suffered from budget constraints, and "serves little intrigue and banks on the sporadic jolts courtesy (of the) loud music." Anupama Chopra of Film Companion rated the film 1.5 stars out of 5 and wrote, "This is the type of film in which the human beings are so annoying that you are actually rooting for the creature that kills them. Basu plays Ahana, the owner of a boutique hotel while Karan a hotel guest and Ahana's admirer played by the totally forgettable actor Imran Abbas. In fact, the creature had more personality than all of them put together. In an effective opening sequence, Vikram introduces him to us by only showing us isolated parts; his talons, monstrous eyes, powerful tail. I think this Creature should have demanded a better script."

Box-office
India Today reports that the film had a budget of Rs.180 million with an additional Rs.70 million spent on a marketing campaign.

Koimoi reported the film opened on 1400 screens, with an average occupancy. The film was a flop at the box office.

References

External links

T-Series (company) films
2014 films
2010s Hindi-language films
2014 3D films
2014 horror films
Indian horror films
2010s monster movies
Films directed by Vikram Bhatt
Films shot in Ooty
Indian 3D films
Hindi-language horror films
Indian monster movies